Isomerida separata is a species of beetle in the family Cerambycidae. It was described by Galileo and Martins in 1996. It is known from Ecuador and Colombia.

References

Hemilophini
Beetles described in 1996